At the 2011 Pan Arab Games, the judo events were held at Qatar Sports Club in Doha, Qatar from 10–12 December. A total of 16 events were contested.

Medal summary

Men

Women

Doping

Two athletes from Judo were caught using performance-enhancing drugs.  Gold medalist Safouane Attaf from Morocco in Men's -81 kg and gold medalist Gaballa Mahmoud from Egypt, which was a mistake of his doctor who prescribed a flu medicine which had an extract of a substance included in the doping list, in the Men's -100 kg were caught and stripped of their medals.  The silver medalists have since been upgraded to gold, however no bronze medalists have moved up to silver.

Medal table

References

External links
Judo at official website

Arab Games
Events at the 2011 Pan Arab Games
2011